Hot 3 (styled as HOT3; ; also available in HD as HOT3 HD) is an Israeli television channel of the cable television company 'HOT'. First introduced as The Family Channel in the early 1990s and later simply as Channel 3, it was one of the first exclusive channels of regulated cable television in Israel.

History
The channel was founded by Udi Miron in 1989 together with the establishment of ICP (Israel Cable Programming), and was one of the first cable channels in Israel with their launch in 1990.

At first the channel's Program Schedule was mostly made of Dramas, some American shows from the past (Soap, All in the family), Soap Operas such as The Young and the Restless, and a few experimental original productions.

Within a few years, the channel became the Israeli home of many successful television shows from America and other countries, adding the tag line "The best shows in the world". However, in 2002 the channel lost this privilege due to a financial dispute with Warner Bros. and could not continue to air content distributed by Warner. This resulted in Channel 3 losing shows such as Friends, ER, The Sopranos and The West Wing – all of which were purchased by other channels.

Since then the channel added more and more original content while continuing to air non-Warner purchased shows. The channel's name was changed to "Hot 3" in 2004, not long after the three Israeli cable companies united and became the "Hot" company.

To date, the longest-running original show in the channel was Good Evening with Guy Pines, a televised magazine hosted by Guy Pines, covering the world of entertainment both in Israel and the world. This show aired at least 4 times a week for 13 seasons between 1997 and 2010, and an earlier version was the Israeli Entertainment Tonight, also hosted by Pines which aired from 1994 to 1996. Pines also covered events such as film festivals around the world before Good Evening started. Good Evening with Guy Pines moved to Channel 10 in 2010.

Rebranding
January 2010 saw the launch of Hot 3 HD, a high definition simulcast of Hot 3. Although a year earlier, in January 2009, the channel already produced the first ever Israeli original drama to be shot in high definition – Timrot Ashan (Pillars of Smoke).

In October 2011, the original SDTV channel was transferred to 16:9 widescreen broadcast, with accordance to most of its content, after more than 20 years of broadcasting in 4:3 aspect ratio.

Currently, many of the channel's acquisition series have moved to HOT HBO, and since then the channel has been focusing on original and reality dramas and continues to broadcast several series of acquisitions.

References

External links
 Official website 

Television channels and stations established in 1989
Television channels in Israel
Hot (Israel)